The Electoral district of Gunbower was an electoral district of the Victorian Legislative Assembly. It was created by The Electoral Act Amendment Act 1888 taking effect at the 1889 elections. The district was bound by the County of Bendigo and the Loddon, Murray and Campaspe Rivers.

Members

Election results

References

See also
 Parliaments of the Australian states and territories
 List of members of the Victorian Legislative Assembly

Former electoral districts of Victoria (Australia)
1889 establishments in Australia
1945 disestablishments in Australia